The Diocese of Duleek was an Irish diocese, firstly subsumed by the Diocese of Meath and now within the Diocese of Meath and Kildare.

It began as an early Christian monastic settlement. St Patrick established the bishopric circa 450 AD.

Bishops

Other Senior Clergy

See also

References

External links
 St Cianan
 Titular Episcopal See of Duleek
Saint Fergus, Bishop of Duleek

Religion in County Meath
Bishops of Duleek
Archdeacons of Duleek